Johnny DeFrancesco (born January 18, 1965) is an American blues guitarist. He is the son of organist 'Papa' John DeFrancesco, and the brother of organist Joey DeFrancesco.

Biography
DeFrancesco grew up outside of Philadelphia, Pennsylvania. By the time he was 14, he was already performing in local Philadelphia jazz clubs with his father. At the age of 18 DeFrancesco had achieved recognition on the Philadelphia scene for his blues vocals and guitar playing.

In 1997, DeFrancesco joined the faculty of Berklee College of Music in Boston, Massachusetts where he taught a number of notable guitarists including John Mayer.  He currently resides in Philadelphia, and performs with his group the Johnny DeFrancesco Power Trio. He has worked with Duke Jethro, John Lee Hooker, Luther Tucker, Johnny Heartsman, and Ike Turner.

Discography

As leader/co-leader
 A Tribute To B.B. King's 'Live At The Regal'  (Ton A'Chopps, 2017) - with Duke Jethro
 The DeFrancesco Brothers (Vectordisc #016, 2011) - with Joey DeFrancesco
 I Saw It Comin'  (Vectordisc #010, 2009) - with guest: Joey DeFrancesco
 Power Trio Live! (Horseplay, 2000)
 Make A Move (Ton A'Chopps, 1995)

As sideman
 "Papa" John DeFrancesco - A Philadelphia Story (Savant, 2011)
 "Papa" John DeFrancesco - Walking Uptown (Savant, 2004)
 "Papa" John DeFrancesco - Jumpin'  (Savant, 2003)
 "Papa" John DeFrancesco - Hip Cake Walk (HighNote, 2001)
 Khani Cole - Places (Fahrenheit, 1999)
 "Papa" John DeFrancesco - Doodlin' (Muse, 1993)

References

1965 births
Living people
American blues guitarists
American male guitarists
Berklee College of Music faculty
Musicians from Philadelphia
20th-century American guitarists
20th-century American male musicians